USS John J. Powers (DE-528) was an  of the United States Navy during World War II. She was sent off into dangerous North Atlantic Ocean waters to protect convoys and other ships from German submarines and fighter aircraft. She performed escort and anti-submarine operations in battle areas before sailing home victorious at the end of the conflict.

She was named in honor of John James Powers, a U.S. Navy Medal of Honor recipient who died during the Battle of the Coral Sea. The John J. Powers  was laid down 25 September 1943 by Boston Navy Yard; launched on 2 November 1943; sponsored by Mrs. John J. Powers, mother of Lt. Powers; and commissioned on 29 February 1944.

World War II North Atlantic operations 
After shakedown training off Bermuda, John J. Powers returned to Boston, Massachusetts, on 19 April for anti-submarine exercises. She then steamed to New York to join a convoy for northern Europe, departing on 2 May. The ship returned with another convoy on 28 May 1944. With American troops and equipment building up in England for the cross-channel invasion, John J. Powers made a second convoy voyage, arriving Boston on 2 August 1944. She then engaged in training followed by a coastal run from New York to Halifax and back.
 
The escort vessel got underway for Atlantic convoy duty again on 19 September 1944, escorting a convoy of tankers and barges to England. Seven days later the alert ship rescued four crewmen from capsized Army tug ST-719. John J. Powers returned to New York on 20 November and in December conducted special depth charge tests for the Bureau of Ordnance off New York and in Chesapeake Bay. In the months that followed, the ship made three more escort voyages to Casablanca, departing Mers El Kébir on 7 May 1945, the day of the German surrender.

End-of-War inactivation and decommissioning 
John J. Powers returned to New York on 23 May 1945 and, after maneuvers in Casco Bay, Maine, arrived Miami, Florida, on 21 July for duty as a training ship. During August she provided tactical training for student officers in the Straits of Florida. The war over, John J. Powers sailed on 8 September 1945 for Charleston, South Carolina, where she decommissioned on 16 October 1945. 
 
The ship was scrapped by Charleston Navy Yard in February 1946.

References

External links

 

 

Evarts-class destroyer escorts
Ships built in Boston
1943 ships
World War II frigates and destroyer escorts of the United States